The Bread Seller Woman (Turkish:Ekmekçi Kadın) is a 1965 Turkish drama film directed by Zafer Davutoğlu and starring Türkan Şoray, İzzet Günay and Çolpan İlhan. It is an adaptation of the French novel The Bread Peddler by Xavier de Montépin.

Cast
 Türkan Şoray 
 İzzet Günay 
 Çolpan İlhan 
 Kenan Pars 
 Efgan Efekan 
 Kadir Savun
 Hüseyin Baradan 
 Faik Coşkun 
 Hakkı Haktan 
 Asim Nipton 
 Senih Orkan 
 Mürüvet Sim 
 Nubar Terziyan

References

Bibliography 
 Laurence Raw. Exploring Turkish Cultures: Essays, Interviews and Reviews. Cambridge Scholars Publishing, 2011.

External links 
 

1965 romantic drama films
Turkish romantic drama films
1965 films
1960s Turkish-language films
Films based on French novels